Supronovo is a rural locality (a village) in Korotovskoye Rural Settlement, Cherepovetsky District, Vologda Oblast, Russia. The population was 27 as of 2002.

Geography 
Supronovo is located 67 km southwest of Cherepovets (the district's administrative centre) by road. Chayevo is the nearest rural locality.

References 

Rural localities in Cherepovetsky District